Terry (November 17, 1933 – September 1, 1945) was a female Cairn Terrier performer who appeared in many different movies, most famously as Toto in the film The Wizard of Oz (1939). It was her only credited role, though she was credited not as Terry but as Toto. She was owned and trained by Carl Spitz and Gabrielle Quinn.

Life and career

Terry, born in the midst of the Great Depression, was trained and owned by Carl Spitz. She was the mother of Rommy, another movie Cairn terrier, who appeared in other films including Reap the Wild Wind (1942) and Air Force (1943). Her first film appearance was in Ready for Love (1934) which was released on November 30, 1934, roughly one month before her first major film appearance, with Shirley Temple, in Bright Eyes (1934) as Rags.

She did her own stunts, and was seriously injured during the filming of The Wizard of Oz (1939), when one of the Winkie guards accidentally stepped on her foot, breaking it. Terry spent two weeks recuperating at Judy Garland's residence, and Garland developed a close attachment to her. Garland offered to buy Terry from Spitz, but he refused to sell her. Terry's $125 per week salary, was more than that of many human actors in the film, and also more than the average working American at the time. She attended the premiere of The Wizard of Oz at Grauman's Chinese Theater; because of the popularity of the film, her name was formally changed to Toto in 1942.

She had 23 total film appearances, three of which were playing in theaters at the same time in the fall of 1939: The Wizard of Oz, The Women, and Bad Little Angel. Among the last ones was Tortilla Flat (1942), in which she was reunited with Oz director Victor Fleming and Frank Morgan, who played Professor Marvel and the Wizard. Terry's final film role was in Easy to Look At, released three weeks before her death.  Her penultimate film, Adventures of Rusty, was released posthumously just five days after her death. She was uncredited in both films.

Death 

Terry died at age 11 in Hollywood on September 1, 1945, and was buried at Spitz's ranch in Studio City, Los Angeles. The grave was destroyed during the construction of the Ventura Freeway in 1958.

On June 18, 2011, a permanent memorial for Terry was dedicated at the Hollywood Forever Cemetery in Los Angeles.

Filmography

 Ready for Love (1934) as Dog (uncredited)
 Bright Eyes (1934) as Rags, Loop's Dog (uncredited)
 The Dark Angel (1935) as Dog (uncredited)
 Fury (1936) as Rainbow, Joe's Dog (uncredited)
 The Buccaneer (1938) as Landlubber (uncredited)
 Barefoot Boy (1938) as herself
 Stablemates (1938) as Pet Dog (uncredited)
 The Wizard of Oz (1939) as Toto
 The Women (1939) as Fighting Dog at Beauty Shop (uncredited)
 Bad Little Angel (1939) as Rex, the Dog (uncredited)
 Calling Philo Vance (1940) as McTavish (uncredited)
 The Ghost Comes Home (1940) as Dog in Pet Shop (uncredited)
 Son of the Navy (1940) as Terry
 Cinderella's Feller (1940 short) as Rex the Dog (uncredited)
 The Old Swimmin Hole (1940) as Toto (uncredited)
 The Chocolate Soldier (1941) as Dog (uncredited)
 Rings on Her Fingers (1942) as Dog (uncredited)
 Twin Beds (1942) as Dog (uncredited)
 Tortilla Flat (1942) as Little Paelito (uncredited)
 George Washington Slept Here (1942) as Dog (uncredited)
 The Heavenly Body (1944) as Dog in Groomer's Tub (uncredited)
 Adventures of Rusty (1945) as Skipper (uncredited)
 Easy to Look At (1945) as Toto (uncredited) (final film role)

See also
 List of individual dogs

References

External links

 
Toto aka Terry at Animal Discovery 
 Toto memorial

1933 animal births
1945 animal deaths
Dog actors